Kurmangazy Sagyrbaev (Qūrmanğazy Sağyrbaıūly; 1823–1896) was a Kazakh composer, instrumentalist (kobyz, dombra), and folk artist. He influenced Kazakh musical culture. He was born in 1818 in the Bukey Horde (now Zhanakala District, West Kazakhstan Region). He is buried in the Astrakhan region of Lower Volga in today's Russian Federation.

Legacy

In 1993, Sagyrbaev's image has been used on the 5 Kazakhstani tenge banknote, and on a Khazakh stamp in 1998.

The Kazakh National Conservatory is officially named after Kurmangazy.

References

External links

1823 births
1896 deaths
19th-century composers
19th-century male musicians
Dombra players
Kazakhstani composers
Male composers
People from West Kazakhstan Region